Khuld is a sum (district) of Dundgovi Province in central Mongolia. In 2007, its population was 2,458.

References 

Districts of Dundgovi Province